Krapina-Zagorje County is a county in northern Croatia, bordering Slovenia. It encompasses most of the historic region called Hrvatsko Zagorje.

The area contains the excavation site of a 100,000-year-old Neanderthal man in caves near the central town of Krapina. The existence of Krapina itself has been verified since 1193, and it has been a common site for castles and other country houses of Croatian, Austrian and Hungarian rulers.

Other towns of the county are Zabok, Pregrada, Zlatar, Oroslavje, Donja Stubica, Klanjec. The town of Stubica features another thermal spring, the Stubičke spa. Also in the area are the medieval castles Veliki Tabor, Miljana, Bežanec, Hellenbach, Milengrad etc.

Krapina-Zagorje County borders on Varaždin County in the northwest, Zagreb County in the southwest and southeast, and the city of Zagreb in the south.  The county contains many vineyards. 15% of the year, fog significantly lowers visibility in the area.

Administrative division
Krapina-Zagorje County is divided into 7 towns or cities, 25 municipalities and 422 settlements:

 Town of Krapina (county seat)
 Town of Donja Stubica
 Town of Klanjec
 Town of Oroslavje
 Town of Pregrada
 Town of Zabok
 Town of Zlatar
 Municipality of Bedekovčina
 Municipality of Budinšćina
 Municipality of Desinić
 Municipality of Đurmanec
 Municipality of Gornja Stubica
 Municipality of Hrašćina
 Municipality of Hum na Sutli
 Municipality of Jesenje
 Municipality of Kraljevec na Sutli
 Municipality of Krapinske Toplice
 Municipality of Konjščina
 Municipality of Kumrovec
 Municipality of Marija Bistrica
 Municipality of Lobor
 Municipality of Mače
 Municipality of Mihovljan
 Municipality of Novi Golubovec
 Municipality of Petrovsko
 Municipality of Radoboj
 Municipality of Sveti Križ Začretje
 Municipality of Stubičke Toplice
 Municipality of Tuhelj
 Municipality of Veliko Trgovišće
 Municipality of Zagorska Sela
 Municipality of Zlatar Bistrica

Demographics 

Since the late 1940s the county's population has been slowly shrinking. As of the 2011 census, the county had 132,892 residents. The population density is 110 people per km². Of the 132,892 residents, 68,243 (or 51.35%) were female and 64,649 (or 48.65%) were male. The average age of the population is 41.7 year. The average age of female residents is, at 43.7 years, higher than that of male residents, at 39.6 years.

Ethnic Croats form the majority with 98.84% of the population, followed by Slovenes (0.31%), Serbs (0.16%) and Albanians (0.1%), with other ethnicities making up the rest.

References

External links

 

 
Counties of Croatia